The Tait Memorial Trust [TMT] is a charitable foundation, first established in the United Kingdom, with the chief purpose of providing financial support to outstanding young performing artists from Australia and New Zealand who wish to pursue post-graduate studies in leading performing arts institutions or privately with internationally recognised teachers in the United Kingdom. It also offers performance opportunities in their many concerts and events in London and advice and mentoring to awardees. The TMT was founded by Isla Baring OAM in memory of her father, Sir Frank Tait and his brothers, who played an important part in the establishment of theatre and the performing arts in Australia. Sir Frank, the youngest of the Tait brothers, carried the firm J. C. Williamson's into its most successful years dominated by the Sutherland-Williamson opera company in 1965 which brought Dame Joan Sutherland back to her homeland.

At inception, the TMT's activities were based in the UK, reflecting a historical tradition of strong institutional links between Australian music academies and British institutions such as the Royal College of Music, Royal Academy of Music, the Royal Northern College of Music and the Guildhall School of Music and Drama. The Trust offers awards/grants for postgraduate study, performance opportunities to young musicians and classical ballet performing artists from Australia and New Zealand, and general help in the furtherance of their careers while resident in the UK.

History
The TMT was established in 1992, in the United Kingdom, the founding patrons being Dame Joan Sutherland AC OM DBE, Viola, Lady Tait AM, John McCallum AO CBE and Googie Withers AO CBE. Isla's mother, the soprano known as Viola Wilson, inspired her to organise a fundraising concert in support of a young Australian singer, Liane Keegan, who was newly arrived in London. From that beginning the TMT has grown to become one of the leading supporters of Australian artists in the UK

In 2011 an Australian Trust to support the work of the TMT was created under the name of "The Tait Performing Arts Association". In May 2017 the Trust formally announced funding of young artists from New Zealand.

Structure

The Tait Memorial Trust

Chairman
Isla Baring OAM,

Founding Patrons
Dame Joan Sutherland AC OM DBE,
Viola, Lady Tait AM,
John McCallum AO CBE,
Googie Withers AO CBE

Patrons
Leanne Benjamin AM OBE,
Danielle de Niese,
John Frost AM,
Julian Gavin,
Barry Humphries AO CBE,
Piers Lane AO,
June Mendoza AO OBE,
Ermes de Zan

Trustees
Justin Baring,
Isla Baring OAM,
Anne Longdon,
Matthew Phillips,
Susie Thornton

Committee
Lisa Bucknell,
Fay Curtin,
Meredith Daneman,
Jan Gowrie-Smith,
Wendy Kramer,
Gayle McDermott,
Sue McGregor,
Patricia Nimmo,
Melanie Rendall,
Margaret Rodgers,
Barbara Ross,
Ann Seddon,
Jacqueline Thompson,
Rosemary Tuck

Honorary Member
Nicola Downer AM

Music Board
Dr Helen Ayres,
Isla Baring OAM,
Jessica Cottis,
Jayson Gillham,
Deborah Humble,
Belinda McFarlane,
Anthony Roden,
Katrina Sheppeard,

Ballet Board
Leanne Benjamin AM OBE,
Isla Baring OAM,
Meredith Daneman

Administrator
James Hancock

The Leanne Benjamin Awards
The Tait Memorial Trust in collaboration with Leanne Benjamin OBE launched new ballet awards for young Australian dancers studying in the UK. The proceeds from the first event at The Royal Ballet School on Thursday 12 June 2014 were added to this scholarship fund. Australian students at the school including Sophie Moffatt, Josephine Frick, Kiely Groenewegen, Grace Robinson, Harry Churches, Connor Barlow (English National Ballet School) and Kenji Wilkie performed for an audience which included Lady Sainsbury and Sir Peter Wright. The evening ended with a masterclass given by Leanne Benjamin.

The first recipient, Josephine Frick, was presented with a cheque for £8,000 at a Tait Friends event at Australia House on Tuesday 14 October 2014 as a contribution to her fees at The Royal Ballet School.

Alumni
The Trust has helped many young singers and instrumentalists who have subsequently performed with British orchestras, leading opera companies and major international ballet companies, including Thomas Rann, Daniel de Borah, Mary-Jean O'Doherty, Li-Wei, Amy Dickson, Elena Xanthoudakis, Valda Wilson, Yelian He, Lauren Fagan, Alexandra Hutton, Phoebe Humphreys, Siobhan Stagg, Kelly Lovelady, Simon Lobelson, Helena Dix, Miranda Keys, Liane Keegan, Benjamin Bayl, William Chen, Natalie Christie, James Hancock, Grant Doyle, Kelly Lovelady, Melbourne Chamber Strings, Melbourne Piano Trio, Derek Welton, Leslie John Flanagan, Jayson Gillham, Morgan Pearse, Julian Gavin, Joanna Cole and Kevin Penkin.

References

External links
 Tait Memorial Trust Homepage
 Charity Commission listing for the Tait Memorial Trust

Educational charities based in the United Kingdom